Gomer Llewelyn Gunn (third ¼ 1885 – fourth ¼ 1935) was a Welsh rugby union, and professional rugby league footballer who played in the 1900s.

Background
Gomer Gunn's birth was registered in Treherbert, Wales, and his death aged 50 was registered in Bradford, West Riding of Yorkshire, England.

Playing career

International honours
Gomer Gunn won a cap for Other Nationalities (RL) while at Bradford F.C., he scored a goal in the 11-26 defeat by England at Park Avenue, Bradford on Monday 2 January 1905.

Career at Bradford
Gomer Gunn was a non-playing interchange/substitute to travel in Bradford FC's 5-0 victory over Salford in the Championship tiebreaker during the 1903–04 season at Thrum Hall, Hanson Lane, Halifax on Thursday 28 April 1904, in front of a crowd of 12,000. Gomer Gunn played  in Bradford F.C.'s 5-0 victory over Salford in the 1906 Challenge Cup Final during the 1905–06 season at Headingley Rugby Stadium, Leeds, on Saturday 28 April 1906, in front of a crowd of 15,834.

Career at Wigan
Gomer Gunn played left-, i.e. number 4, and scored a try in Wigan's 18-2 victory over Batley in the Championship semi-final during the 1908–09 season at Central Park, Wigan on Saturday 17 April 1909, but he did not play in the 7-3 victory over Oldham in the final during the 1908–09 season at The Willows, Salford on Saturday 1 May 1909, with Lance Todd taking his place in the team.

Notable tour matches
Gomer Gunn played left-, i.e. number 4, in Wigan's 16-8 victory over Australia in the tour match at Central Park, Wigan on Wednesday 20 January 1909.

Genealogical information
Gomer Gunn was the son of James Gunn, the manager of several cinemas in the Rhondda Valley, and the brother of Alfred Gunn, George Gunn, Walter Gunn, Susan Ann Gunn (married name Mitchell, husband Arthur Mitchell), Elizabeth Mary Gunn and Albert Gunn. Gomer Gunn's marriage to Annie (née Bentley (birth registered during second ¼ 1885 in Keighley district)) was registered during second ¼ 1906 in Keighley district. Gomer Gunn's first wife Annie died during first ¼ 1922 in North Bierley district. Gomer Gunn's marriage to Elsie (née Richardson) took place at Bradford Cathedral (St Peter's Church, Bradford until 1919) on Saturday 30 March 1929, and was registered during first ¼ 1929 in Bradford district.

Note
In the referenced photograph "Welshman Gomer Gunn" at rlhp.co.uk, Gomer Gunn is shown wearing a 1904-5 cap, and what appears to be a Wales national team shirt, as yet there are no references detailing him playing for Wales at either rugby league, or rugby union. The Wales national rugby league team did not play its first international until Wednesday 1 January 1908, so the 1904-5 cap is unlikely to be associated with Wales national rugby league team, and may be his Other Nationalities cap as this was won in the 1904-5 season, and the shirt being his Welsh Schoolboys shirt.

References

External links
Statistics at wigan.rlfans.com
1909 Tour Match: Wigan 16 Australia 8
"Welshman Gomer Gunn - Gomer Gunn played full-back for Bradford from 1903 until 1908. - Date: 01/01/1905" at rlhp.co.uk
Search for "Gomer Gunn" at britishnewspaperarchive.co.uk

1885 births
1935 deaths
Bradford F.C. players
Keighley Cougars players
Other Nationalities rugby league team players
Rugby league centres
Rugby league fullbacks
Rugby league players from Treherbert
Rugby union players from Treherbert
Treherbert RFC players
Welsh rugby league players
Welsh rugby union players
Wigan Warriors players